Tracy Grant Lord is a leading New Zealand scenographer and costume designer of ballet, theatre and opera. She has worked with numerous Australasian performance companies including the Royal New Zealand Ballet, New Zealand Opera, Australian Ballet, Opera Australia, Queensland Ballet as well as the Auckland, Sydney, Melbourne and Queensland Theatre Companies.  

Grant Lord graduated with a degree in Spatial Design from Auckland University of Technology in 1996. She was 23 when she designed my first opera.

In 2011 she was nominated for Best Costume Design for the 11th Helpmann Awards and in 2012 she was nominated in the same category for the 12th Helpmann Awards.  

In 2014 Grant Lord created the costumes for the Singapore Dance Theatre production of Sleeping Beauty. Grant Lord has created designs for several productions for the Royal New Zealand Ballet (RNZB) including their positively reviewed 50th Anniversary production Romeo and Juliet (2003), this production contrasted a set pieces reminiscent of Verona and costumes with a modernist feel. It toured throughout New Zealand being presented at St James Theatre, Wellington (Wellington), Municipal Theatre (Napier), Aotea Centre (Auckland), Founders Theatre (Hamilton), Regent on Broadway (Palmerston North), Regent Theatre (Dunedin), and the Theatre Royal (Christchurch), where it opened the Christchurch Arts Festival. The RNZB production of Romeo and Shortly toured to the United Kingdom and received a nomination for best new dance production at the Laurence Olivier Awards. Other production for RNZB include Ihi FrENZy (2001), The Wedding (2006) a love story written by Witi Ihimaera with choreography by Mark Baldwin and music by Gareth Farr, Cinderella (2007) and The Firebird (2020) with choreographer Loughlan Prior.

Opera Lord Grant has designed includes the production design in 2014 of Lucia di Lammermoor directed by Raymond Hawthorne produced by Auckland Chamber Orchestra and Auckland Opera Studio. William Dart's review states:Working with designer Tracy Grant Lord, Hawthorne's 18th century Scotland was grim and foreboding under the lights of Jennifer Lal. An effectively austere set was built around various cross motifs; costumes were rigorously dark-toned, apart from a white wedding dress for Lucia and a brilliant red gown for her final swansong.Other work with director Raymond Hawthorne includes set and costumes for the musical Guys and Dolls for Auckland Theatre Company in 2015 with lighting by Andrew Potvin. 

Grant Lord collaborated regularly with lighting designer Kendall Smith and choreographer Liam Scarlett to create works such as A Midsummer Night’s Dream and Dangerous Liaisons for Queensland Ballet.

Awards 
1997 – (finalist) Best Craft in Short Film Drama’ - New Zealand Film and Television Awards 
1999 – UNESCO Prize for Emerging Artists - Prague Quadrennial
1999 – Best Production Design - St Kilda Film Festival (for short film Possum)
2003 – Jury Award - Prague Quadrennial
2011 – Helpmann Award Nomination for In the Next Room - Sydney Theatre Company
2012 – Helpmann Award Nomination for The Importance of Being Earnest - Melbourne Theatre Company

References

Year of birth missing (living people)
Living people
New Zealand scenic designers
New Zealand production designers
Theatre designers
New Zealand theatre people
New Zealand costume designers
Women costume designers
Scenographers